Laurent Alexandre (born 9 June 1973) is a French politician of La France Insoumise who has been representing Aveyron's 2nd constituency in the National Assembly since 2022.

See also 

 List of deputies of the 16th National Assembly of France

References 

Living people
1973 births
Deputies of the 16th National Assembly of the French Fifth Republic
21st-century French politicians
La France Insoumise politicians
Members of Parliament for Aveyron